The 34th World Orienteering Championships were held in Tartu, Estonia in June/July 2017. The official name of the event is Nokian Tyres World Orienteering Championships 2017 after the title sponsor Nokian Tyres.

Event dates and locations

Results

Medal summary

Medal table

References 

World Orienteering Championships
2017 in Estonian sport
International sports competitions hosted by Estonia
Sport in Tartu
June 2017 sports events in Europe
July 2017 sports events in Europe
Orienteering in Estonia
2017 in orienteering